The Rural Pre-University College, Kanakapura is a pre-university college in Kanakapura, Ramanagar district, Karnataka, India.

High schools and secondary schools in Karnataka
Schools in Ramanagara district